Rockwell Center is a high-end mixed-use area in Makati, Metro Manila, Philippines, named after James Rockwell, former President of Manila Electric Railroad and Light Company (Meralco). It is a project of Rockwell Land Corporation, which is owned by the Lopez Holdings Corporation. Rockwell Center was first developed in 1998 and is being expanded since 2012. The architectural firm Skidmore, Owings & Merrill (SOM) carried out the design under the direction of former design partner Larry Oltmanns, while Felino Palafox and his company, Palafox Associates, became responsible for the master-planning of the complex. Its centerpiece, the Power Plant Mall, opened on December 26, 2000. Rockwell Center includes office buildings, condominium towers, a professional school and a shopping mall.

Location and vicinity

Rockwell Center was constructed on a 15.5-hectare lot in Makati Poblacion previously occupied by a thermal plant, which was operated by then Lopez-owned Manila Electric Railroad and Light Company until its closure in 1994. The lot is bounded by J.P. Rizal Avenue to the north, where it faces the Pasig River; Estrella Street to the east; Rockwell Drive and Amapola Street to the south; and R. Palma Street to the west.

Proscenium at Rockwell
Marking the expansion of Rockwell Center is The Proscenium at Rockwell, a  mixed-used luxury development standing in the property formerly known as the Colgate-Palmolive (Philippines) headquarters. The complex is designed by world-renowned architect Carlos Ott. The development consists of five residential towers, luxurious retail spaces, an office tower, and a Performing Arts Theater, featuring limited and spacious  units for each floor of the towers. The five residential towers are named the Kirov, Sakura, Lincoln, Lorraine, and the Iconique Tower. 

The development's office tower component, The 1 Proscenium Office, as well as the Rockwell Performing Arts Theater, is slated for completion in 2021.

Tenants

Shopping and retail
 Power Plant Mall
 Joya Retail Row
 One Rockwell Retail Row
 8 Rockwell Retail Row

Schools
 Ateneo Professional Schools
 Career Academy Asia

Office buildings
 8 Rockwell (The Lopez Tower)
 Nestlé (Philippines) headquarters 
 Phinma Plaza
 1 Proscenium (under construction)

Residential buildings
 Aruga Apartments
 Rizal Tower
 Luna Gardens
 Amorsolo Square
 Hidalgo Place
 Edades Tower
 Joya Lofts and Towers
 One Rockwell
 One Rockwell East Tower
 One Rockwell West Tower
 The Manansala
 The Proscenium at Rockwell
 Kirov Tower 
 Sakura Tower 
 Lincoln Tower 
 Lorraine Tower 
 Proscenium Residences 
 The Balmori Suites (under construction)

Cultural and Entertainment buildings
 Rockwell Performing Arts Theater (under construction)

See also
 ABS-CBN Broadcasting Center
 ELJ Communications Center

References

External links
 Rockwell Center official website
 Rockwell Center satellite image on Google Maps
 Rockwell Power Plant photo, at Correos Filipinas

Mixed-use developments in Metro Manila
Makati
Redeveloped ports and waterfronts in the Philippines
Buildings and structures in Makati
Pasig River